Kalyke , also known as , is a retrograde irregular satellite of Jupiter. It was discovered by a team of astronomers from the University of Hawaii led by Scott S. Sheppard in 2000, and given the temporary designation .

From infrared thermal measurements by the WISE spacecraft, Kalyke's albedo is measured at 2.9%, corresponding to a diameter of 6.9 kilometres. It orbits Jupiter at an average distance of 23,181,000 km in 766.61 days, at an inclination of 166° to the ecliptic (165° to Jupiter's equator), in a retrograde direction and with an eccentricity of 0.2140.

It was named in October 2002 after the Greek mythological figure Kalyke or Calyce.

It belongs to the Carme group, made up of irregular retrograde moons orbiting Jupiter at a distance ranging between 23 and 24 Gm and at an inclination of about 165°. Kalyke is redder in color (B−V=0.94, V−R=0.70) than other moons of the Carme group, suggesting that it is a captured centaur or TNO, or a remnant of such an object that collided with the Carme group progenitor.

References

Carme group
Moons of Jupiter
Irregular satellites
Discoveries by Scott S. Sheppard
Astronomical objects discovered in 2000
Moons with a retrograde orbit